Lateh Choqa Sayyadan (also Romanized as Lateh Choqā Şayyādān; also known as Lāneh Chīā, Lāneh Jīā, Lateh Choqā, and Şayyādān) is a village in Gowavar Rural District, Govar District, Gilan-e Gharb County, Kermanshah Province, Iran. At the 2006 census, its population was 737, in 134 families.

References 

Populated places in Gilan-e Gharb County